Qulleq, Qutdleq or Kutdlek is an uninhabited island in the King Frederick VI Coast, Sermersooq municipality in southern Greenland.

Geography
Qulleq is an irregularly-shaped island that lies off the southeastern coast of Greenland. It is located 5.5 km from the shore off the mouth of the Anorituup Kangerlua fjord, to the NNE of Cape Tordenskjold, northeast of Nuuk Point. 

Qulleq is the largest and southernmost island of a small offshore archipelago of four main islands, including Qipinnguak close by to the west, Takisoq to the northwest and Qeqertarsuaq to the north.

History
Qutsigsormiut is an important Paleo-Eskimo archaeological site on Qulleq's southern coast. It is located by a south-facing bay known as Qulleq Sound that forms a sheltered natural harbour.

A LORAN transmitting station was built on the southeastern point of the island and lies now abandoned.

See also
List of islands of Greenland

References

External links
Distribution Map of Archaeological, Historic, Cultural and Ancient Sites sites in Greenland
New insights on the north-eastern part of the Ketilidian orogen in South-East Greenland
Uninhabited islands of Greenland
Kujalleq